James Bennett Davis (September 15, 1924 – November 30, 1995) was an American professional baseball pitcher who appeared in 154 games in Major League Baseball for the Chicago Cubs (–), St. Louis Cardinals and New York Giants (1957). In 1956, Davis became the first MLB pitcher in forty years to record four strikeouts in a single inning.

He graduated from Red Bluff High School and served in the United States Marine Corps during World War II. He signed with the Boston Red Sox in 1946 and toiled in their farm system for four years before his contract was sold to the Triple-A Seattle Rainiers in 1950. After he appeared in 157 games over four seasons for Seattle, Davis was acquired by the Cubs in 1954.

Davis' repertoire included both a screwball and a knuckler. His rookie 1954 season was his finest; he set MLB career bests in games (46), victories (11), winning percentage (.611), complete games (two), saves (four, ninth in the National League), and earned run average (3.52 in 127 innings pitched). But on May 27, 1956, Davis entered the record books when he struck out four Cardinals in the sixth inning of the first game of a doubleheader. Davis fanned Hal Smith, Jackie Brandt and Lindy McDaniel in succession; McDaniel reached first base on an error by Cub catcher Hobie Landrith, allowing a run to score but prolonging the frame long enough for Davis to get Don Blasingame on a called third strike.

Davis was traded to the Cardinals (with Landrith) after the 1956 season, and in ten 1957 relief appearances for St. Louis he recorded one save, but pitched ineffectively. He was waived to the Giants on June 4, and worked in ten more games before returning to the minor leagues. He retired in 1959 after a 14-year professional baseball career. In 154 MLB games, 39 as a starting pitcher, he posted a 24–26 won–lost record and a 4.01 earned run average, with four complete games, one shutout and eight saves. In 406 innings pitched, he allowed 383 hits and 179 bases on balls, with 197 strikeouts.

Two of Davis' uncles, Lee and Marv Grissom, were major league pitchers. Davis and Marv Grissom opposed each other 11 times between 1954 and June 1957, and were briefly teammates on the 1957 Giants.

Jim Davis died in San Mateo, California, at age 71 in 1995.

See also
 List of Major League Baseball single-inning strikeout leaders

References

External links

1924 births
1995 deaths
Baseball players from California
Birmingham Barons players
Chicago Cubs players
Knuckleball pitchers
Lynn Red Sox players
Major League Baseball pitchers
Minneapolis Millers (baseball) players
New York Giants (NL) players
People from Red Bluff, California
St. Louis Cardinals players
Scranton Red Sox players
Seattle Rainiers players
Sacramento Solons players
United States Marine Corps personnel of World War II